Ngô Vi Liễn (5 November 1894 – 14 May 1945) was a Vietnamese mandarin, scholar and literary researcher.

Liễn was born on 5 November 1894 in Tả Thanh Oai village, Hà Đông province (now Tả Thanh Oai commune, Thanh Trì district, Hà Nội).

Early life 
Liễn was born into a Confucian family. He was educated in High School of the Protectorate, Thông ngôn school (interpretation school) and graduated from College of Jurisprudence in Hanoi.

From 1928 to 1939, he served as Tri huyện (governor of district), successively in Cẩm Giàng, Quỳnh Côi, Bình Lục and Võ Giàng. He collected information and compiled geographical books of these districts.

Works 
As a trained and passionate researcher, Liễn compiled 8 works and co-authored 3 other books. Especially when he served as a tri huyện (governor of a district), he conducted a comprehensive study of the places under his jurisdiction and completed three district geography books.

His works include:

 Địa dư huyện Bình Lục, Hà Nội, 1935
 Địa dư huyện Quỳnh Côi, Hà Nội, 1933
 Địa dư huyện Cẩm Giàng, Hà Nội, 1931
 Nomenclature des communes du Tonkin, Hà Nội, 1928
 Địa dư các tỉnh Bắc Kì, Hà Nội, 1927

Memorial 
In 2016, a street in Phủ Lý, Hà Nam Province was named "phố Ngô Vi Liễn" after him, un memory of this former governor of Bình Lục district, Hà Nam Province.

References 

Vietnamese scholars
1894 births
1945 deaths
People from Hanoi
Nguyen dynasty officials